All Light Will End is a 2018 American thriller film written and directed by Chris Blake, in his feature-length directorial debut, starring Ashley Pereira, Sam Jones III, Sarah Butler, John Schuck, and Andy Buckley.

Premise

Young, successful horror novelist Savannah Martin's (Ashley Pereira) new book is taking the genre by storm. Her father (Andy Buckley), the police chief of her small hometown, investigates murders and foul play too grim for their bucolic life. As she and her friends settle in for a relaxing weekend at her childhood home, the dark secret at the crux of Savannah's success stirs in her dreams and seeps into her reality. Amidst sexual tensions and fireside stories, Savannah's despondency and her father's case collide with gruesome and horrifying reveals, leaving little distinction between the subconscious and reality.

Cast
 Ashley Pereira as Savannah
 Alexandra Harris as Faith
 Sam Jones III as Adam
 Sarah Butler as Diana
 Andy Buckley as Chief David
 John Schuck as The Psychiatrist
 Ted Welch as Jack  
 Graham Outerbridge as Paul
 Michael James Thomas as Leeland
 Katie Garfield as Kelly Rae
 Rich Redmond as Chris Issac
 Aaron Munoz as Stache
 Briana Tedesco as Young Savannah
 Iain Tucker as The Lineman Brothers
 Bill Billions as Bill

Production
The film was shot on location in various areas of Nashville, Tennessee.

Release
The film premiered on March 24, 2018, at the HorrorHound Film Festival in Cincinnati, Ohio, then held its Canadian premiere at the Toronto International Spring of Horror on April 8, 2018. It was announced that the film would also screen at the Tupelo Film Festival on April 19 and April 21, 2018, as well as the International Horror Hotel Film Festival in June. The film was acquired for distribution by Gravitas Ventures and is set for release in November 2018.

Awards
 Best Original Screenplay, Toronto International Spring of Horror (2018)
 Best Feature Film, Tupelo Film Festival (2018)
 2nd Place for Suspense-Thriller, International Horror Hotel Film Festival (2018)

References

External links
 
 
 

2018 films
2018 horror films
2018 independent films
American independent films
Films shot in Tennessee
American horror thriller films
2010s English-language films
2010s American films